James Henry Gundy (March 22, 1880 - November 10, 1951) was a Canadian businessman who co-founded Wood Gundy and Company, stockbrokerage in Toronto, Ontario in 1905.

He was born in Harriston, Ontario and at age eighteen moved to Toronto, where he was employed by Central Canada Loan and Savings Co., a company started by George Albertus Cox. In 1900 he joined the newly formed stock brokerage firm, Dominion Securities In 1905 he and fellow Dominion Securities employee George Herbert Wood teamed up to go into the municipal and provincial bond underwriting business. They formed Wood Gundy and Company with offices on the corner of King and Yonge streets in downtown Toronto.

Gundy became a successful and influential member of the Canadian financial community. During World War I, he was chair of Special Subscriptions Committee -  Victory Loans 1911-1918. He served as president of the Investment Dealers Association of Canada 1920-1921, was a Governor of the Investment Bankers' Association of America, and served on the board of directors of Canada Cement, Massey-Harris, Simpsons Ltd, Dominion Steel and Coal Company.

Gundy donated the land for Serena Gundy Park in Toronto, named in his first wife's memory. His son Charles Lake Gundy became president of Wood Gundy and served until his death in 1978.

He died in 1951 and was buried in the Mount Pleasant Cemetery, Toronto.

References
 Filey, Mike. Mount Pleasant Cemetery (1990) Firefly Books 
 Wood Gundy history at the CIBC website
Bigwigs.  Ayer Publishing, 1935

1880 births
1951 deaths
Businesspeople from Ontario
Stock and commodity market managers
People from Old Toronto
People from Wellington County, Ontario